The Anglican Diocese of Bo (Sierra Leone) is a diocese of the Church of the Province of West Africa, a member church of the worldwide Anglican Communion.  Its partner diocese is Chichester, England.

The current diocese, along with the Anglican Diocese of Freetown, was formed in 1981 by the partition of the previous Diocese of Sierra Leone, which had been established in 1852. The diocese of Sierra Leone, together with the dioceses of Niger, Accra, Lagos and the Diocese of the Gambia and the River Pongas, had been formed, with some local resistance, into the Province of West Africa in 1951.

 the Bishop of Bo is the Right Reverend Emmanuel Tucker, the third Bishop of the Diocese.

Bishops of Sierra Leone
 1852–1854 Owen Vidal (1st bishop, died at sea, 1854)
 1855–1857 John Weeks
 1857–1860 John Bowen (died in office of yellow fever)
 1860–1869 Edward Beckles
 1870-1882 Henry Cheetham
 1883–1897 Graham Ingham
 1897–1901 John Taylor Smith
 1902–1909 Edmund Elwin
 1910–1921 John Walmsley
 1923–1936 George Wright (afterwards Bishop of North Africa, 1936)
 1936–1961 James L.C. Horstead (also Archbishop of West Africa, 1955–1961)
 1961–1981 Moses N.C.O. Scott (also Archbishop of West Africa, 1969–1981)

Bishops of Bo
 Michael Keili, 1981 - 1994
 Samuel Gbonda, 1994 - 2008
 Emmanuel Tucker, 2008 - 2019
 Solomon Scott-Manga, 2020 -

See also

References

External links
 Diocesan website

Bo
 
Christian organizations established in 1981
Bo
Anglicanism in Sierra Leone
Dioceses of the Church of the Province of West Africa